Lawrence J. Brock is a Canadian politician who was elected to represent the riding of Brantford—Brant in the House of Commons of Canada in the 2021 Canadian federal election. Prior to his election, he was the assistant Crown attorney for Brantford.

Electoral record

References

External links

Living people
Conservative Party of Canada MPs
Members of the House of Commons of Canada from Ontario
Politicians from Brantford
21st-century Canadian politicians
1964 births